Daniel C. Esty is an American environmental lawyer and policymaker. He is the Hillhouse professor at Yale University with appointments at Yale Law School and the Yale School of the Environment. From 2011 to 2014, Esty served as Commissioner of the Connecticut Department of Energy and Environmental Protection. He launched a series of renewable power and energy efficiency finance programs, including Connecticut's first-in-the-nation Green bank and statewide property assessed clean energy (C-PAC) finance system.

Esty is a commentator on business, energy and climate change issues, and has been quoted in publications such as The Financial Times, The Wall Street Journal, The New York Times, Harvard Business Review, Nature, The Economist, HuffPost, and Scientific American. He has been a commentator on NPR and has appeared on The Colbert Report, The O'Reilly Factor, and the Glenn Beck Program to speak on issues of business innovation and the environment.

Education 
Esty earned his A.B. in economics from Harvard College and J.D. from Yale Law School. He also studied as a Rhodes Scholar at Balliol College, Oxford, from which he received a MPhil in philosophy and politics.

Career
Prior to joining the Connecticut Department of Environmental Protection, Esty was the Hillhouse Professor of Environmental Law and Policy at Yale University. He held faculty appointments in both Yale’s Yale School of the Environment and Law Schools. He also served as the Director of the Yale Center for Environmental Law and Policy and the Center for Business & Environment at Yale (CBEY).

Esty was a Senior Fellow at the Peterson Institute for International Economics in 1993 and 1994, served in a variety of senior positions on the United States Environmental Protection Agency from 1989 to 1993, and practiced law in Washington, D.C. from 1986 to 1989.

Esty spent the 2000–2001 academic year as a Visiting Professor at INSEAD, the European business school in Fontainebleau, France. In 2002, Esty received the American Bar Association Award for Distinguished Achievement in Environmental Law and Policy for “pioneering a data-driven approach to environmental decision making” and developing the global Environmental Sustainability Index. He served four years as an elected Planning and Zoning Commissioner in his hometown of Cheshire, Connecticut. He also served as an energy and environmental policy adviser on the Barack Obama 2008 presidential campaign and as a member of the Presidential Transition Team.

He has advised companies on energy, environment, and sustainability issues and serves as the Chairman of the Esty Group, a corporate sustainability strategy group based in New Haven, Connecticut. He sits on the board of directors of the Energy Future Coalition, Resources for the Future, and the Connecticut branch of The Nature Conservancy.

Publications 
Esty is the author or editor of ten books and a number of articles on environmental policy issues and the relationships between environment and corporate strategy, competitiveness, trade, globalization, governance, and development. His book published in 2006, Green to Gold: How Smart Companies Use Environmental Strategy to Innovate, Create Value, and Build Competitive Advantage, argues that pollution control and natural resource management have become critical elements of marketplace success and explains how leading-edge companies have folded environmental thinking into their core business strategies. The book was followed by Green to Gold Business Playbook: How to Implement Sustainability Practices for Bottom-Line Results in Every Business Function.

Personal life 
He is married to Elizabeth Esty, former U.S. Representative for Connecticut's 5th congressional district and former member of the Connecticut House of Representatives. They have three children, Sarah, Thomas, and Jonathan.

Notes 

1959 births
American non-fiction environmental writers
American Rhodes Scholars
Connecticut Democrats
Connecticut lawyers
Harvard College alumni
Academic staff of INSEAD
Living people
People of the United States Environmental Protection Agency
Radical centrist writers
Spouses of Connecticut politicians
State cabinet secretaries of Connecticut
Yale Law School alumni
Yale Law School faculty